The Allagash Wilderness Waterway is a  protected area extending from Aroostook County, Maine into Piscataquis County, Maine. It is a ribbon of lakes, ponds, rivers, and streams of the Maine North Woods that includes much of the Allagash River. Canoeing, fishing, hunting, and camping are among the activities permitted.

References

External links
Allagash Wilderness Waterway Department of Agriculture, Conservation and Forestry
Allagash Wilderness Waterway Map Department of Agriculture, Conservation and Forestry

State parks of Maine
Allagash River
North Maine Woods
Northern Forest Canoe Trail
Water trails
Protected areas of Aroostook County, Maine
Protected areas of Piscataquis County, Maine
Protected areas established in 1966
1966 establishments in Maine
Wild and Scenic Rivers of the United States